The Kids Will Have Their Say is the debut album by the Boston hardcore punk band SS Decontrol.  The album was released in 1982 as a split-release between Dischord and X-Claim records (catalog numbers X-Claim 1/Dischord 7½).  The album was only pressed in 1,000 copies and never re-pressed, making it quite a collector's item. However, a bootleg version was made in the late 1980s, but the label names on the back of the sleeves are switched to Discord and Ex-Claim, making it easy to separate from the original pressing.

Track listing

Side A
"Boiling Point" (0:54)
"Fight Them" (1:07)
"Do You Even Care" (0:29)
"Not Normal" (0:52)
"Wasted Youth" (0:33)
"Jock Itch" (0:46)
"Fun to You" (0:34)
"V.A." (0:59)
"How Much Art" (3:05)

Side B
"The Kids Will Have Their Say"   (1:20)
"Headed Straight" (1:29)
"War Threat" (1:27)
"Teach Me Violence" (0:36)
"Screw" (0:21)
"Who's to Judge" (1:26)
"Police Beat" (1:58)
"United" (0:46)
"The End" (1:28)

Personnel
Springa - vocals
Al Barile - guitar
Jaime Sciarappa - bass
Chris Foley - drums

1982 debut albums
SSD (band) albums
Dischord Records albums